Michael Stephen Seresin, ONZM BSC, (born 17 July 1942) is a New Zealand cinematographer and film director.

In addition to his work in film, Seresin is a winemaker, having founded Seresin Estate in the Marlborough wine region in 1992.

He is the son of Harry Seresin (1919–1994), who was a key figure in the hospitality and café scene in Wellington, and brother of Ben Seresin, who is also a cinematographer.

In the 2009 New Year Honours, Seresin was appointed an Officer of the New Zealand Order of Merit, for services to the film and wine industries.

His home in Queen Charlotte Sound, New Zealand was featured on the BBC's The World's Most Extraordinary Homes.

Filmography

Awards
Nominations

2000: BAFTA Awards – Best Cinematography, Angela's Ashes

Wins
2007: Camerimage – Duo Award: Cinematographer–Director (shared with Alan Parker)

See also
List of celebrities who own wineries and vineyards

References

 Michael Seresin dossier cinematographers.nl
 Michael Seresin info New York Times.com

Footnotes

External links
 Seresin Estate official site
 

1942 births
Living people
New Zealand cinematographers
New Zealand winemakers
Officers of the New Zealand Order of Merit
People from Wellington City